Aged care in Australia (also known as elderly care), is the provision of services to meet the unique needs of older people in Australia. It includes both residential aged care (nursing homes) as well as services provided in the home such as personal care, domestic assistance, home nursing, nutrition and meal preparation, respite services, continence management, mobility & dexterity assistance, transport, social support and the provision of equipment and aids.

In Australia, many aged care services are subsidised by the Department of Health to help keep costs manageable and affordable.  Australians who are eligible for government subsidies to help fund the costs of aged care services will still be expected to contribute to the cost of services if they can afford to.

Ageing Population in Australia 
Australia’s population is getting older, due to longer life expectancy and low fertility rates. Results of the 2016 national census show that one in six Australians is now aged over 65. By 2056, it is projected there will be 8.7 million older Australians (22% of the population); by 2096, 12.8 million people (25%) will be aged 65 years and over.

The impact of our ageing population is an increase in the number of Australians needing help in aged care. In 2016, almost a quarter of a million people (249,000) were using residential care, home care or transition care services—a 31% increase over the last decade.

The public aged-care system is already under strain, with fewer places than there is demand. By 2060, aged care demands are expected to put additional pressure on Australian governments equivalent to about 6 per cent of national GDP.

Since 2012, the government has been introducing reforms that move towards consumer-directed aged care - a more market-driven environment where the consumer (or their carer) can choose their service provider.

In response, more private business providers are entering the market, in competition with the government-funded and not-for-profit providers that have historically dominated. However, there is no official government channel that regulates private aged-care providers and reports on their quality of services such as staffing levels and skills and quality of care.   The government announced a public inquiry into misconduct in the sector in September 2018. The Australian Broadcasting Corporation produced two-part documentary focusing on alleged neglect and abuse of older people. Service providers, including Estia Health, Regis Healthcare and Japara Healthcare lost about a sixth of their value.

Older Australians are now faced with a wider range of options than ever in how they receive aged care services, and who provides them.

Aged Care options in Australia
The three main options available to older people are:
 Stay in their own home and access in-home care and services to help them remain independent.
 Move into an aged care home where meals, accommodation and nursing services (if required) are available
Move into a retirement village where some services are available for a fee.

In-home Aged Care
Most older Australians prefer to remain in their own home as they get older. 83% of people over 60 surveyed in the Housing Decisions of Older Australians research paper by the Australian Government's Productivity Commission in 2015, preferred to continue living in their own home (compared to 6% who preferred living in a retirement villages and 1% in a residential aged care facility.) If a person is generally able to manage but needs extra assistance with day to day tasks, they can access a number of services to support their independence while remaining in their own home.

Types of services that people can access in their home include:
 Personal care
 Domestic assistance
 Nutrition and meal preparation
 Continence management
 Mobility and dexterity assistance
 Nursing, allied health and other clinical services
 Transport and assistance getting around in their community
 Equipment and aids.
 Social Support
 Flexible Respite
 Allied Health Services / Physiotherapy / Occupational Therapy / Dietetics / Podiatry

Funding for In-Home care
There are two types of funding provided by the Australian Government available to help subsidise the costs of in-home aged care services for eligible people.

Home Care Package
A Home Care Package provides long-term help to allow people to stay independent in their own home as long as possible and offer four levels of care packages to support people with basic, low, intermediate, and high care needs.

Depending on the level of support needed, an aged care services provider can work with an individual to create a care plan tailored to their needs. A Home Care Package can deliver a mix of services including:
 Personal care
 Domestic assistance
 Nutrition and meal preparation
 Continence management
 Mobility and dexterity assistance
 Nursing, allied health and other clinical services
 Transport and assistance getting around in their community
 Provision of equipment and aids
 Assistive technology
It is possible to change services or move to a different level of package based on changing needs.

Older Australians or their carer can contact the My Aged Care service provided by the Australian Government to find out if they can access government funding to help cover the cost of Aged Care Services. My Aged Care can arrange for the person to be assessed by the Aged Care Assessment Team (ACAT) or ACAS (Victoria only).

The funding a person receive varies depending on the level of their Home Care Package and is paid direct to the service provider. If personal circumstances allow, the Government expects people receiving funding to contribute to the cost of their care.

The amount they will need to contribute is based on their income and is determined by the Department of Human Services.

Commonwealth Home Support Programme
If a person only requires short-term help or some assistance with daily activities around the home, the Commonwealth Home Support Programme allows them to access the specific services they need, when they need them. The Commonwealth Home Support Programme lets the older person choose the services they need as required.
Services available under the Commonwealth Home Support Programme include:
 Personal care
 Domestic assistance
 Meal preparation
 Social support
 Flexible respite
 Allied Health / Physiotherapy
The person can choose from a set menu of services based on when they need them and can enter and leave the programme as their needs change.

To access services provided by the Commonwealth Home Support Programme, the person will need to be assessed by a team member from the Regional Assessment Service either in their home or on the phone.

The subsidy programme does not necessarily fund the full cost of the service, so each person may pay a small contribution. Special consideration is available to people experiencing financial difficulty.

Costs of in-home Care
The Australian Government pays for the bulk of aged care in Australia. However, to receive help at home through the government’s home care packages, one needs to contribute towards one or both of the following:

 A basic daily fee, which is a percentage of one's aged pension
 A means-tested fee, payable if one's income is over a certain amount

Once an individual has had an ACAT assessment, this will be sent to Centrelink, which will determine how much needs to be paid. 

An ACAT assessment is a comprehensive assessment with an Aged Care Assessment Team. ACATs are teams of medical, nursing and allied health professionals who assess the physical, psychological, medical, restorative, cultural and social needs of frail older people and help them and their carers to access appropriate levels of support. 

The cost will vary depending on whether the funding is provided under the Commonwealth Home Support Programme or the Home Care Packages Program. If a person is not eligible for a subsidy from the Australian Government, they can still access aged care services privately but will be required to cover the associated costs.

2017 Government changes to in home care
In February 2017, the Australian Government introduced Increasing Choice in Home Care reforms. These reforms are designed to give older people more choice and control over their home care. Recipients of government funding to cover the cost of aged care services are now able to choose their preferred provider of in home aged care services. They can also choose to change their provider at any time.

Once a person’s application for funding is successful, they will be allocated their funding based on how long they have been waiting and also on their individual care needs and personal circumstances.

A person can accrue unspent funds that are left over from their package after any expenses and fees have been deducted. If they change home care provider these unspent funds will be transferred to the new provider.

After 27 February 2017, aged care providers are able to charge customers an exit fee to cover administrative costs which will be deducted from any unspent funds. Providers are legally required to publish their maximum exit fees on the My Aged Care website. Not all providers require exit fees.

Aged care homes
As people grow older, they may need more help with day-to-day tasks or health care. In some cases the best way to receive help and support can be by living in an aged care home (also known as nursing homes) either on a permanent basis or for a short stay (called "residential respite").

Aged care homes offer accommodation services (also known as “hotel services”) and personal care assistance (e.g. bathing & personal hygiene, continence management, dressing). Aged care homes may also provide complex care and services such as specialized bedding materials, non-customized mobility goods, incontinence aids, nursing services and allied health services.

Most aged care homes in Australia receive funding from the Australian Government. The aged care system in Australia aims to make sure that all older people can receive support and quality care when they need it.

If a person’s care needs are less than those supplied by an aged care home, independent living units or retirement villages are an alternative. These residential communities offer a variety of services for older people to help them live independently, and are regulated by state and territory governments.

A younger person with disabilities can also live in residential aged care settings.  As of 2015, over 7,000 young disabled people lived in aged care homes.  A goal of the National Disability Insurance Scheme is to get younger people with disabilities out of residential age care settings.

Funding for residential Aged Care

The Australian Government funds the majority of aged care in Australia but people are expected to contribute to the cost of their care if they can afford to.

There are also specific programmes and information available to Aboriginal and/or Torres Strait Islander people; people from culturally or linguistically diverse backgrounds; people who are lesbian, gay, bisexual, transgender or intersex; or Care-Leavers.

Older veterans, those who are financially disadvantaged, people living with disability and those living away from large towns can also access tailored support.

To determine eligibility to receive funding, a member of an Aged Care Assessment Team (ACAT, or ACAS in Victoria) will carry out an assessment with the person to identify their needs and circumstances and work out what options are available to them.

Aged Care Assessment
Whether an older person requires help with basic tasks at home or more intensive aged care services, they will need to arrange an assessment with the My Aged Care service.

My Aged Care will register the person’s details and ask them a series of questions to help identify their needs and circumstances such as:
 any support they are currently receiving
 if they have any health concerns
 how they are managing with activities around the home
 some questions relating to their safety in the home
From there they may be referred for a home support assessment, a comprehensive assessment, or direct referral to services.

Home support assessment
If a person has entry level aged care needs, My Aged Care may arrange a home support assessment to identify their care needs. The assessment will be undertaken by a local assessor from the My Aged Care Regional Assessment Service.

Comprehensive assessment
If the older person has more complex aged care needs, a comprehensive assessment by a member of an Aged Care Assessment Team (ACAT, or ACAS in Victoria) may be organized for them if they want to access government funded services or if they are considering moving into an aged care home. A person may also need to have a comprehensive assessment if they are ready to leave hospital, or if they need a short break in an aged care home (also called 'respite care').

See also
Royal Commission into Aged Care Quality and Safety
Dementia and Alzheimer's disease in Australia

References

External links